Dushyant Chaturvedi is a Shiv Sena politician from Nagpur, Maharashtra. He is current Member of Legislative Council from Yavatmal local authorities constituency. He is the son of former Congress minister Satish Chaturvedi.

Positions held
 2020: Elected to Maharashtra Legislative Council.

References

External links
  Shivsena Home Page 

Living people
Shiv Sena politicians
Members of the Maharashtra Legislative Council
Marathi politicians
Year of birth missing (living people)